The Tale of the Giant Rat of Sumatra is the seventh comedy album produced by the Firesign Theatre and released in January 1974 by Columbia Records.  It is a send-up of a Sherlock Holmes adventure, "The Giant Rat of Sumatra", which was not written by Sir Arthur Conan Doyle but was referenced in his Holmes tale, "The Adventure of the Sussex Vampire", written in 1924.

Track listing

Side one - London
"Chapter 1 - Not Quite The Solution He Expected"
"Chapter 2 - An Outrageously Disgusting Disguise"
"Chapter 3 - Where There's Smoke, There's Work"

Side two - Chicago
"Chapter 4 - Where Did Jonas Go When The Lights Went Out?"
"Chapter 5 - Pickles Down The Rat Hole!"
"Chapter 6 - The Electrician Exposes Himself!"

Title and narrative premise

Holmes fans and writers of Sherlockiana have speculated on the nature of the giant rat story for decades. The Firesign Theatre version seems to begin with Watson about to write the tale anyway since the pair are desperate for money, but he never quite gets around to telling it.

Philip Proctor plays detective Hemlock Stones (Sherlock Holmes) and David Ossman plays Dr. Flotsam (Dr. Watson), his "patient doctor and biographer". The lighthearted tale is full of puns, including a running gag in which Flotsam, eager to chronicle the adventure, tries to write down everything Stones says but mishears it all as something similar-sounding; for example, "rattan-festooned" is written down as "rat-infested." Allusions also are made to Sherlock Holmes's use of cocaine ("Stones, you snowball!"), his violin playing, and other familiar story elements.

Commentary
Following a string of solo projects and anthologies, this was the group's first album to consist entirely of a single cohesive narrative since I Think We're All Bozos on This Bus.

An earlier version of these sketches, released as the bootleg By the Light of the Silvery, is closer to the spirit of the group's nightclub performances, and is strikingly reminiscent of The Goon Show, which was one of the group's main inspirations. It bears almost no resemblance to the version that was finally committed to vinyl.

This album was followed by Everything You Know Is Wrong and In the Next World, You're on Your Own before the group finally ended its association with Columbia Records.

Release history
This album was originally released simultaneously on LP and 8 Track.

LP - Columbia KC-32730
8 Track - Columbia CA-32730

It has been re-released on CD at least once

2001 - Laugh.com LGH1076

Reviews

Members of the group themselves have taken varied attitudes towards this album.  In the liner notes to Shoes for Industry: The Best of the Firesign Theatre, David Ossman was cheerful when discussing it and said that "I always thought it was the closest thing to the relentlessly pun-filled one-acts we did in clubs." Phil Austin, on the other hand, said, "The Sherlock Holmes album didn't do anybody any good . . . the general public was by that point beginning to tire of psychedelia anyway, and we were unfortunately always going to be associated with that."

The review in 1983's The New Rolling Stone Record Guide calls this album "A halfassed comeback containing only one good joke."

The Firesign Theatre commentary website benway.com calls it "the least understood Firesign album" and notes that "careful listening reveals Firesign in all their glory: poetic ("blackening peasant's houses", "me and the doc on the dock with the dog -- the deadly dog"), silly ("I sat on my pipe!"), strange (the hole in Lake Acme), and filled with meaning and non-meaning alike. It is well worth repeated listenings—it rivals "Bozos" and "Dwarf" in number of listenings—and pays dividends of laughter and insight."

References

Notes
Firesign Theatre.  The Tale of the Giant Rat of Sumatra.  Columbia Records, 1974.
Firesign Theatre. Firesign Theatre. 19 Jan. 2006 <http://www.firesigntheatre.com/>.
"FIREZINE: Linques!." Firesign Theatre FAQ. 20 Jan. 2006 <http://firezine.net/faq/>.
Smith, Ronald L.  The Goldmine Comedy Record Price Guide. Iola: Krause, 1996.

1974 albums
The Firesign Theatre albums
Columbia Records albums
Sherlock Holmes pastiches
1970s comedy albums